Three ships of the French Navy have borne the name Brune, in honour of the Brune river, a river of Aisne.

Ships 
 , a 6-gun corvette of barque.
 , a 32-gun .
 , a 20-gun .

See also

Notes and references

Notes

References

Bibliography 
 

French Navy ship names